The Battle of Trnava or Battle of Nagyszombat was a battle in the Hussite Wars between the Hussites and the Hungarian-Royalists-Serbian army near Trnava (Nagyszombat) in the Kingdom of Hungary (today  in Slovakia). The battle was fought in three phases, on 23, 25 and 28 April 1430 and ended in Hussite victory.

In the summer of 1430, 10,000 Hussites from Moravia invaded Hungary under Velek Koudelník of Březnice. The Hussites in Pozsony County looted and set on fire 100 villages. Against Koudelník stood an army under Sigismund, and Stibor of Stiboricz. The army included Hungarian and Transylvanian soldiers and Serbs. Another army under Jan Mátik z Tolovec was composed of Royalists. Mátik was jealous of Stiboricz, because of the trust placed in Stiboricz by Sigismund. At the front of the army, Stiboricz and the Hungarian-Serbian forces charged the Hussites, but Mátik and the Royalists deliberately hung back. The Royalists army belatedly arrived; the plan of campaign was a concentrated charge against the Hussite war-wagons. Koudelník was killed in the battle, and Sigismund's army was forced to flee.

In the battle, 6,000 Royalists, Serbian and Hungarian troops, and 8,000 Hussites were killed. In 1431 the Hussite army again invaded Upper Hungary, but Miklós Rozgonyi defeated the Hussites in the battle of Ilava.

References

Sources 
 
 
 
 A Nagyszombati csata (Magyar Katolikus Lexikon)

1430 in Europe
Trnava 1430
Battles involving Hungary in the Middle Ages
Battles involving Serbia in the Middle Ages
Battles involving Bohemia
Military history of Hungary
Conflicts in 1430
Serbian Despotate
History of the Trnava Region